Melanocinclis is a genus of moth in the family Cosmopterigidae.

Species
Melanocinclis gnoma Hodges, 1978
Melanocinclis lineigera Hodges, 1962
Melanocinclis nigrilineella (Chambers, 1878)
Melanocinclis sparsa Hodges, 1978
Melanocinclis vibex Hodges, 1978

References
Natural History Museum Lepidoptera genus database

Cosmopteriginae